Enid Wyn Jones (17 January 1909 – 15 September 1967) was a Welsh nurse.

Jones was born in Wrexham, the daughter of Dr. David Llewelyn Williams and Margaret Williams. Just before World War I, she moved with her family to Cardiff but re-located to Rhyl where she was brought up during the war. She trained as a nurse at Cardiff Royal Infirmary but during her childhood, she went to Ashford Welsh Girls' school from 1919-1926. On 9 September 1936, she married Emyr Wyn Jones of Waunfawr, Caernarfon, who was a cardiologist and physician at Liverpool Royal Infirmary. They had two children. She traveled abundantly throughout Wales and England due to her work but her home was at Llety'r Eros, Llansannan. Her work primarily surrounded religious, social and medical fields in England and Wales.

Young Women's Christian Association 

Jones was heavily involved with the Young Women's Christian Association (YWCA). Through this connection she was:
 Involved with the Presidency of the Welsh Council and Vice-Presidency of the British Council from 1959-1967
 Representative the Welsh Council at meetings/conferences abroad and was a member of the World Council
 President of the Women's Section of the National Free Church Council of England and Wales, 1958-1959
 President of the Women's Branch of the New Wales Union, 1966-1967

Medical career 
Jones made meaningful and considerable contributions towards the field of nursing and medical administration. She was:
 Vice-chairman of the Nursing Advisory Council
 Member of the Welsh Hospital Board
 Member of North Wales Mental Hospital administration
 Contributor to the Clwyd and Deeside Hospital Management Committees
 Member of the Medical Executive Committee of Denbighshire and Flintshire, plus in the Central Committee of the Royal Medical Benevolent Fund
 County Vice-President and Commandant of the Denbighshire Branch of the British Red Cross Society.

Jones attended various meetings regarding social, religious and medical matters all over the world representing YWCA and was a member of BBC Religious Committee. While on a flight home from Melbourne, where she had been representing Wales at the World Council of YWCA, she died on 15 September 1967. She was buried in Llansannan.

References

Further reading 

1909 births
1967 deaths
Welsh nurses
British women nurses
People from Wrexham